Totterdown Fields was the first London County Council cottage estate built between 1901 and 1911 It contained 1244 individual houses built over . The estate was designated a conservation area, on 19 September 1978.

Context

It was the first London County Council cottage estate built between 1901 and 1911 in Wandsworth. It was influenced by Ebenezer Howard's Garden city movement and the Arts and Crafts movement. The principal architect was Ernest Stone Collins.

See also
Boundary Estate

References

Notes

Bibliography

External links

Housing estates in the London Borough of Wandsworth